Nebregovo is a village in the municipality of Dolneni, North Macedonia.

History
Toponyms such as Arbanasi, literally meaning "Albanians", as well as toponyms referring to the presence of Latins such as  Latinska Crkva - Latin Church, or Latinski Grobišta- Latin Graves are found in Nebregovo. The well-known poet and linguist Blaže Koneski considers the latter to be nothing more but churches and tombs of a former Catholic Albanian population in the village, with Latini representing a term used by Orthodox Slavs to refer to Catholic Albanians.

Demographics
According to the 2021 census, the village had a total of 118 inhabitants. Ethnic groups in the village include:

Macedonians 105
Others 13

Notable people
 Blaže Koneski (1921-1993), poet
 Gligor Sokolović (1872-1910), Chetnik leader

References

Villages in Dolneni Municipality